Leon Rice (born 23 August 1951) is a former Australian rules footballer who played with Hawthorn in the VFL during the 1970s.

Football career
When Rice was 14 he won the Warragul District Junior FL best and fairest in 1965.
Rice was recruited to Hawthorn from Drouin when the VFL had zoning areas in 1970. 
A wingman, Rice was a premiership player with Hawthorn in 1971 and was a reserve in their 1976 flag win.

He left Hawthorn and accepted the Captain-coach position at the Camberwell Football Club. The club won 1981 VFA second division premiership.

After he retired as a player Rice joined the Hawthorn Football Club board.

Honours and achievements 
Hawthorn
 2× VFL premiership player: 1971, 1976
 2× Minor premiership: 1971, 1975

Individual
 Hawthorn life member

External links

1951 births
Living people
Australian rules footballers from Victoria (Australia)
Hawthorn Football Club players
Hawthorn Football Club Premiership players
Hawthorn Football Club administrators
Camberwell Football Club players
Camberwell Football Club coaches
Two-time VFL/AFL Premiership players